The Billboard Tropical Airplay chart is a subchart of the Latin Airplay that ranked the best-performing songs received on radio stations that primarily played tropical music. On the issue dated January 21, 2017, Billboard revised the methodology of the chart to measure airplay based on audience impressions of tropical music songs over approximately 140 Latin music radio stations. Published by Billboard magazine, the data are compiled by Nielsen Broadcast Data Systems based collectively on each single's weekly airplay.

Chart history

References

United States Tropical Songs
2017
2017 in Latin music